The 1961 Harelbeke–Antwerp–Harelbeke was the fourth edition of the E3 Harelbeke cycle race and was held on 11 March 1961. The race started and finished in Harelbeke. The race was won by Arthur Decabooter.

General classification

Notes

References

1961 in Belgian sport
1961